Gary Grant may refer to:
Gary Grant (actor), British television actor
Gary Grant (basketball), American former basketball player
Gary Grant (musician), horn player on albums such as Choose Love
Gary Grant (politician) (born 1934), American politician, member of the Washington state House of Representatives
Gary Grant (serial killer) (born 1951), American serial killer

See also 
 Cary Grant